Sealed With a Kiss was Bobby Vinton's twenty-third studio album for Epic Records. It was released in 1972 just before Epic released Vinton from his contract with them. The title track (a cover of Brian Hyland's 1962 hit) is the album's only single. Other covers include "The First Time Ever I Saw Your Face", "Speak Softly Love", "Some Kind of Wonderful", "Come Softly to Me", "Song Sung Blue", "The End of the World" and "Our Day Will Come".

Track listing

Personnel
Produced by Bobby Vinton
Production coordinator: John Walsh
Arranged and conducted by Al Capps
Engineering: Phil Macy
Special thanks to Pete Bennett
Cover photos: David Sutton

Charts

References

1972 albums
Bobby Vinton albums
Epic Records albums